Indra Mustafa (born 28 June 1999 in Bogor) is an Indonesian professional footballer who plays as a defender for Liga 1 club Borneo.

Club career

Persib Bandung
He was signed for Persib Bandung to play in Liga 1 in the 2018 season. Mustafa made his professional debut on 8 April 2018 in a match against Mitra Kukar at the Gelora Bandung Lautan Api Stadium, Bandung.

Borneo Samarinda
Mustafa was signed for Borneo Samarinda to play in Liga 1 in the 2022–23 season.

International career
In 2018, Mustafa represented the Indonesia U-19, in the 2018 AFC U-19 Championship.

Career statistics

Club

Notes

References

External links
 Indra Mustafa at Soccerway
 Indra Mustafa at Liga Indonesia

Living people
1999 births
People from Bogor
Sportspeople from West Java
Indonesian footballers
Association football defenders
Persib Bandung players
Bandung United F.C. players
Borneo F.C. players
Liga 1 (Indonesia) players
Indonesia youth international footballers